
Year 257 (CCLVII) was a common year starting on Thursday (link will display the full calendar) of the Julian calendar. At the time, it was known as the Year of the Consulship of Valerianus and Gallienus (or, less frequently, year 1010 Ab urbe condita). The denomination 257 for this year has been used since the early medieval period, when the Anno Domini calendar era became the prevalent method in Europe for naming years.

Events 
 By place 
 Roman Empire 
 Gallienus enters into a joint consulship with his father Valerianus I, having brought some order to the Danube area.
 Future emperor Aurelian defeats the Goths and brings many prisoners back to Rome.
 In Bavaria the Limes Germanicus (Upper Raetian Limes) along the river Iller is abandoned by the Romans.
 Valerian, under guardianship of Ingenuus, is established at Sirmium (Pannonia) to represent the Roman  government in the troubled Illyrian provinces.
 Emperor Valerian recovers Antioch, Syria from King Shapur I of Persia.
 The Goths build a fleet on the Black Sea.
 The Goths separate into the Ostrogoths and the Visigoths.

 By topic 
 Religion 
 August 30 – Pope Sixtus II succeeds Pope Stephen I as the 24th pope.
 Valerian's persecution of Christians begins: his edict orders bishops and priests to sacrifice according to the pagan rituals, and prohibits Christians, under penalty of death, from meeting at the tombs of their deceased.

Births 
 Gregory the Illuminator, Armenian religious leader (approximate date)
 Jia Nanfeng (or Shi), Chinese empress (d. 300)

Deaths 
 August 2 – Stephen I, bishop of Rome
 September 26 – Zhu Yi (or Jiwen), Chinese general 
 Wen Qin (or Zhongruo), Chinese general and politician
 Zhang Changpu, Chinese concubine (b. 199)

References